North Holland is a province of the Netherlands.

North Holland may also refer to:
 The Northern Netherlands, see Geography of the Netherlands.
 North-Holland Publishing Company, an imprint of Elsevier
 North Holland Blue, a breed of chickens from North Holland